Henry Berkeley may refer to:

 Henry Berkeley (MP for Totnes), Member of Parliament (MP) for Totnes, 1414–1421 
 Henry Berkeley (died 1587), MP for East Grinstead in 1571
 Henry Berkeley, 7th Baron Berkeley (1534–1613), English peer
 Henry Berkeley (MP for Ilchester) (1579–1667), English politician
 Henry Berkeley (British Army officer) (died 1736), soldier, courtier, and MP for Gloucestershire
 Henry FitzHardinge Berkeley (1794–1870), MP for Bristol
 Henry Spencer Berkeley (1851–1918), barrister and Chief Justice of Fiji